The following is a current and former list of Music Choice cable radio audio channels which are accessible through participating cable providers, Verizon Fios, and DirecTV, along with those who utilize Music Choice's iOS and Google Play mobile apps through TV Everywhere authentication. Several channels are noted which hold a TV Parental Guidelines rating of TV-MA; these channels allow profanity and explicit content in the songs played, with non-noted channels carrying radio edits otherwise.

List of current Music Choice channels

 Note: Channels indicated by an asterisk are exclusive to cable providers and unavailable through DirecTV receivers (though DirecTV customers can access them through the web and app with their TVE credentials). Channels indicated with a dagger are monitored by Mediabase.

Classical

Classical Masterpieces - Classical works from composers of the Renaissance to the present day, generally of considerable length.
Light Classical - Classical works from composers of the late Renaissance to the present day, generally of shorter length than those featured on "Classical Masterpieces".
Opera* - Opera and classical vocal music.

Country

Today's Country † - Modern country music, ranging from the current day to around the mid-2000s.
Classic Country - Traditional country music from the 1940s to around the launch of the new country genre in 1990.
Country Hits - An overall mix of country music, regardless of year or genre.
Americana - Alternative country and Americana music.
Bluegrass - Traditional and contemporary bluegrass music.
Pop & Country † - Modern country music mixed with country-infused pop.

Dance

Dance/EDM (TV-MA) †
Classic Dance (TV-MA) †  - A channel that plays 1970s-1990s electronic-styled dance music, disco and club hits.
Lounge - A mix of electronic chill-out, downtempo, ambient and electronic lounge music.

Jazz/standards

Blues - Blues music from the early artists of the 1920s to present day.
Smooth Jazz
Jazz - Traditional and contemporary jazz mix that utilizes traditional jazz elements.
Soundscapes - Mix of new age and atmospheric music.
Easy Listening  - Instrumentals performed by string orchestras and soloists from around the world. 
Singers & Swing - big band, swing & adult standards. 
Stage & Screen* - Music from film, television themes, and Broadway.

Kids & Family 
Kid's Only - Music popular with youngsters and "tweens", not necessarily "children's" songs. 
Toddler Tunes - Contemporary music aimed at babies, toddlers, and young children; includes lullabies, which are played during the night at 8:00 PM on the east coast and 5:00 PM on the west coast.
Kids Movies and Musicals* (formerly Kids Movie Soundtracks) - Soundtracks from children's and family-friendly movies and musicals.

Latin

Mexicana † - A wide variety of traditional folk music from Mexico, featuring styles such as ranchera, banda and mariachi.
Musica Urbana † - Reggaeton and Latin hip-hop.
Pop Latino † - Today's hottest hits and pop music from Latin artists. 
Romances
Tropicales †
Latin Jazz
Rock Latino - A mix of Spanish-language rock and Latin alternative music.
Teen Ritmos* - English and Spanish-language popular music geared towards teenagers.

Pop & decades

Pop Hits † - A mix of pop music for greatest hits.
Solid Gold Oldies* - Hits from the 1950s and 1960s.
'70s - Hits from the 1970s.
'80s - Hits from the 1980s.
'90s - Hits from the 1990s.
Y2K - Hits from the 2000s, 2010s, and Present.
Music Choice Max † - Today's cutting edge and mainstream popular music. 
Hit List † - Popular Top 40 hits.
Party Favorites - Mix of music for special occasions and parties.
Soft Rock (formerly Light Hits) - Slow and mid-tempo pop music, adult contemporary music, country music, and popular music from the past and present. Up until 2016, the normal schedule was replaced with contemporary Christmas music from November 29 through January 6.
Teen Beats - Popular music geared towards teenagers.
Brits + Hits* - Pop music featuring either vocals from or written by artists from the UK music industry.

Religious

Contemporary Christian - Inspiring and uplifting Christian and worship music from the 1980s to the present.
Gospel - Modern and traditional gospel music.

Rock

Adult Alternative (TV-MA) † - Alternative music that is targeted for more adult audiences.
Alternative (TV-MA) †
Classic Rock - Album-oriented playlists from the 1960s through the 2010s with artists who helped pioneer the genre of rock music.
New Wave
Metal (TV-MA) - Aggressive sounding metal music using exotic and experimental techniques and genres. Most, if not all music on this channel is from the 2000s and 2010s.
Indie (TV-MA) † - Modern day alternative music.
'90s Rock - Popular rock music from the 1990s.
Rock 2K - Popular rock music from the 2000s to the present
Rock † - Popular rock songs like hard rock, heavy metal and alternative metal.
'80s Rock - Glam/hair metal from the 1980s.
Classic Alternative - A mix of 1970s-1990s alternative music.
Classic Metal (TV-MA)* - A mix of 1970s-1990s heavy metal music.
Emo X Screamo (TV-MA)* - A mix of emo, screamo and post-hardcore music.
Punk (TV-MA)* - A mix of 1970s-1990s punk rock music.

Seasonal/holiday 
Classic Christmas (formerly All Christmas) - A 24/7, year-round channel/app that plays a mix of classic popular Christmas music.
Sounds of the Seasons - Special music that plays to celebrate various holidays and seasons. During non-holiday periods, it plays The Pulse.
February 1–14: Love songs for Valentine's Day.
February 15–17: Mardi Gras music.
March 1–21: Irish folk music for St. Patrick's Day.
April 30 – May 6: Cinco De Mayo-related Mexican music.
May 28–31: Summer songs celebrating Memorial Day.
July 1–4: Fourth of July-related American patriotic music.
July 5–31: Christmas in July music.
September 3–6: Labor Day music/end of summer.
September 11: Patriotic and somber music in tribute of the September 11 attacks.
September 12 – October 3: Oktoberfest (German music, yodels and polka).
October 4–31: Halloween music.
November 1 – January 6: Christmas music (including Thanksgiving music played on the day).

Urban

R&B Classics - A variety of funk, soul, and Motown hits from the 1950s to 1990s.
R&B Soul † - Urban adult music and sultry, slow jams.
Hip-Hop and R&B † - Today's hottest hip-hop and R&B music.
Hip-Hop Classics - Old school Hip-hop hits from artists that pioneered the genre of hip-hop.
Throwback Jamz - Mix of R&B, urban hits, and old-school rap from the 1980s to 2000s.
Rap (TV-MA) † - Popular rap music upon its hit songs.
Rap 2K (TV-MA)* - An uncensored mix of modern uncensored rap and non-stop hip-hop from the 2000s.
Underground Hip-Hop (TV-MA)
ALT R&B* 
Funk - A mix of 1970s-1980s funk music.

World 
Reggae - Mix of reggae, ska and other Caribbean rhythms of the past and present.
Brazilian Pop - A mix of classic and contemporary Brazilian popular music.
Filipino - A mix of 90s-today's Filipino popular music.
K-Pop - South Korean popular music.

Others 

 Love Songs - Romantic monster ballads and mid- tempo songs from yesterday and today.
 Folk - A mix of traditional and contemporary folk music.

Channels with limited availability 
These Music Choice channels are only available in some areas and may not have song information. These channels, with the exception of Tejano are also available as part of DirecTV's Music Choice package as of February 10, 2018.

 Contemporary Instrumentals - Instrumental music, containing a mix of smooth jazz, new age, beautiful instrumentals and instrumental cover versions of songs. From November through early January of each year, contemporary instrumental Christmas music is played during the holiday season.
 Hawaiian - Mix of contemporary island music and classics from past decades. Includes local Hawaiian artists performing Hawaiian music and island stylings of non-Hawaiian songs, as well as non-Hawaiian artists performing music from or about Hawaii.

 Taste Of Italy - Italian music, ranging from standards to contemporary Italian-language hits.
 Tejano

Channels exclusive to DirecTV 

 '60s Movement - A selection of hits from the 1960s. 
 Big Band - Big Band music; From 2018, DirecTV pre-empted Big Band and replaced with Christmas music during the holiday season.
 Broadway - Music from Broadway.
 Coffee Shop Cuts - Eclectic mix of singer-songwriters from Adult Alternative to R&B.
 Gospel Hallelujah - Traditional gospel.
 Hard Rock (TV-MA) - Hard rock music.
 Honky Tonk - Jukebox country songs.
 Irish Favorites - Irish music.
 Italian Favorites - Favorite Italian music.
 Jazz Vocal Hits - Favorite jazz vocalists.
 Jazz Vocal Standards - Popular jazz standards.
 Mainstream Rap (TV-MA) - Rap music that dominated the charts.
 Malt Shop Favorites - Classic malt shop jukebox music.
 Movie Scores - Film scores.
 Nature Sounds - Outdoor nature music.
 New Age - New age music.
 Retro Workout - Classic workout music.
 Symphony - Classical symphonies.
 Vietnamese - Vietnamese music.
 Workout (TV-MA) - Workout music.

Online-exclusive channels 
The following channels are exclusive to the Music Choice website and its mobile apps.

 Black Excellence (TV-MA)
 Country Songwriters
 Covers
 Disney Hits
 Disney Piano
 Doo-Wop
 Emo Trap
 Family Hits
 Hip-Hop Songwriters
 Latin Trap Hits (TV-MA)
 Lullabies
 MC Workout: Cardio
 MC Workout: Yoga
 Music Choice Fresh
 Pop & Alt
 Pop Songwriters
 R&B 2K
 Rap Pioneers
 Reggae
 Rock Songwriters
 Sleep Noise
 The Pulse
 Yacht Rock

List of defunct channels
These Music Choice channels over the years have either been taken off the air, renamed, or they were replaced by another channel.
Adult Top 40 - (absorbed into Pop Hits and Hit List)
All Christmas - (renamed Classic Christmas )
Americana - (replaced by True Country, returned as an online exclusive channel in 2017)
Arena Rock - (replaced by Retro Rock)
Bluegrass - (removed in 2009, returned as an online exclusive channel in 2017)
Classic Alternative - (removed in 2013, returned as an online exclusive channel)
Classic Disco - (replaced by MC MixTape)
Classic R&B - (replaced by R&B Classics)
Dance and Electronica - (merged)
Dance/Electronica - (renamed Dance/EDM in 2013)
Indie Rock - (online exclusive, became its own channel on August 5, 2014)
International Love Songs - (removed in 2009 but came back on the air as Love Songs in 2013)
Kids Movie Soundtracks - (renamed Kids Movies and Musicals in 2021)
Lite Rock - (renamed Soft Rock)
MC MixTape - (replaced by MCU in 2012. Songs became part of the Dance/Electronica channel until 2013)
Old School Rap - (renamed Hip Hop Classics in 2009)
Opera - (removed in 2009, returned as an online exclusive channel in 2017)
Power Rock
Pop Rhythmic - (renamed Max in January 2016)
Progressive
R&B Hits - (replaced by Throwback Jamz)
Radio Disney - (replaced by Kidz Only! in 2007)
Retro Rock - (merged with Classic Alternative in 2013 to form Rock Hits)
Rock en Espanol - (replaced by Romances)
Salsa y Merengue - (replaced by Tropicales)
Showcase - (replaced by Hip-Hop Classics and Classic Dance in 2017)
Showtunes - (replaced by Stage & Screen)
Singers and Standards - (renamed Singers and Swing)
Smooth R&B - (replaced by R&B Soul)
Teen MC - (renamed Teen Beats in January 2016)
True Country - (replaced by Country Hits)
Youth Hits - (renamed Family Hits)

References

Music video networks in the United States